York Region Transit (YRT) is the public transit operator in York Region, Ontario, Canada. Its headquarters are in Richmond Hill, at 50 High Tech Road.

YRT operates 65 full-time, rush hour and limited routes, 35 school services, and six Viva bus rapid transit routes. Five contracted Toronto Transit Commission (TTC) bus routes run within York Region's boundaries (one in Vaughan and four in Markham). Passengers who cross Steeles Avenue (the Toronto–York boundary) on these routes must pay an additional fare (the YRT or TTC fare) to continue their trip(s).

Some YRT routes operate within the City of Toronto; these buses generally run to and from TTC subway stations. YRT northbound buses are allowed to pick up passengers south of Steeles Avenue if they are heading into York Region (but passengers must flag the bus from a designated TTC or YRT stop). YRT buses heading to a TTC subway station can similarly drop off passengers at designated stops south of Steeles Avenue, but are not permitted to pick up passengers from these stops. As the majority of passengers are assumed to be transferring to and from TTC services, no extra fare is charged for riders boarding or disembarking YRT buses within Toronto.

Ridership
In Q3 2022, average weekday ridership was approximately 58,500 on buses and 1,200 on MobilityPlus, a service for people with disabilities. 22.8 million riders used YRT in 2016, a 1.4% increase over 2015.

History
YRT was created by the regional government in 2001 to combine the four municipally-managed transit authorities in the region: Vaughan Transit, Markham Transit, Richmond Hill Transit, and Newmarket Transit (Aurora Transit had merged with Newmarket in 1999).

In mid-2006, the YRT logo was modified to bear closer resemblance to the Viva logo and, by the end of the year most of the YRT fleet and bus stop signs had their looks changed to bear the new colours.

Before 1973, several private transit operators provided services around York Region:

 Toronto and York Radial Railway: radial railway along Yonge Street in Vaughan and Markham
 Maple Leaf – Markham Coach Lines: routes taken over by Gray Coach in 1929
 Travelways: operated briefly in Markham in 1973
 Newmarket Bus Lines: 1948–1958
 Newmarket Town Bus: 1958–1960s
 Aurora Bus Lines: operated until 1972

Operations
Transit services in York Region are divided into four divisions and are provided by private operators under contract.

Viva BRT Division
The bus rapid transit (BRT) division operates the six Viva Rapid Transit bus routes and uses the 196-bus garage near Leslie Street and 16th Avenue in Richmond Hill. In 2015, TOK Transit began a seven-year contract, replacing Veolia Transportation (Transdev) as operator.

North Division 
The North division includes several bus routes in Newmarket, Aurora, King Township, East Gwillimbury and Georgina. TOK Transit also operates this division and is under contract until April 30, 2021.

Southeast Division 
The southeast division includes routes in Markham, Richmond Hill, and Stouffville.  It is operated by Miller Transit who are under contract until October 2023.

Southwest Division 
Transdev Canada Inc. is under contract of this division until August 1, 2021.

Bus rapid transit

In response to escalating congestion on the region's roads, York Region's transit plan included a provision for a bus rapid transit system along the Yonge Street and Highway 7 arterial corridors. This service, known as Viva, was launched in September 2005.

Fares
Fares for riding YRT can be paid by cash, Presto cards, credit card, the mobile YRT Pay app or Transit pay app.

, YRT fares are as follows (the same applies for the YRT's BRT service, Viva):

Other fares:

Three separate methods of payments are used by transit routes serving York Region:
"Pay as you board" on conventional YRT and TTC-operated bus routes heading southbound towards Toronto
"Pay as you leave" on TTC bus routes heading northbound into and within York Region (north of Steeles Avenue)
"Proof of payment" basis on all Viva routes (customers may board or disembark at any door)

York Region's rapid transit bus service, Viva operates on a "pre-paid proof-of-payment (POP)" system, meaning passengers in possession of POP can board these buses at any door. Unlike conventional YRT buses, Viva buses are not equipped with onboard fareboxes, which means passengers are required to purchase single-ride tickets from curbside fare vending machines, tap a Presto card on the fare readers located beside the fare vending machines, or activate their mobile ticket or pass at the platforms prior to boarding. A single-ride ticket has the date and expiry time printed on it at the time of purchase and so it does not need to be validated.

Paper POP tickets and transfers are not issued to Presto card holders or YRT Pay app users since both Presto and the app act as POP. Time-based fares and transfers allow for unlimited travel within York Region on a single fare for two hours (including transfers to and from Brampton Transit, Züm, as well as TTC-operated bus routes in York Region north of Steeles Avenue only).

Former fare zones
On July 1, 2017, YRT removed fare zones allowing customers to travel within the region with only one fare. Previously, the YRT/Viva service area was divided into three fare zones. Zone 3 was defined as the portion of York Region north of Ravenshoe Road, and Zones 1 and 2 were divided by Bloomington Road for northbound passengers, just south of King Road for southbound passengers. Passengers crossing a zone boundary had to pay a zone fare supplement in addition to the regular fares.

GO Transit co-fares
As with many other transit agencies within the Greater Toronto and Hamilton Area (GTHA), YRT offers a reduced fare for passengers transferring to YRT or Viva buses from GO Transit under its "Ride to GO" program for those aged 13 and over. Passengers may transfer at a GO train station from a GO Transit route to a YRT bus route or TTC-operated bus routes in York Region (north of Steeles only) and receive free admission onto YRT so long as the passenger provides the GO Transit proof of payment ticket. Since Viva is operated on a proof-of-purchase system and single Viva fares are paid or purchased at curbside fare vending machines, riders must use a Presto card when transferring between Viva and GO Transit services in order to access the Ride to GO co-fare discount.
 Though Viva Purple and Viva Green do not directly serve Unionville GO Station, GO Transit co-fares are accepted when boarding either route at Enterprise Vivastation.
 Due to the proximity of Richmond Hill Centre Terminal and Langstaff GO Station, GO Transit co-fares are accepted for transfers between GO services at Langstaff GO station and YRT services at Richmond Hill Centre.

The GO Transit co-fare discount is available to all passengers aged 13 and older who pay single YRT bus fares on their stored Presto card balance: passengers will automatically be assessed the co-fare (and any YRT or Viva fare supplements, if necessary) when transferring from GO Transit to YRT/Viva services regardless of where the passenger boards the YRT bus. Similarly, passengers transferring from YRT/Viva to GO Transit services will also be reimbursed the difference between the YRT fare and the co-fare upon disembarking from GO Transit (effectively, the YRT portion of the journey is paid with a co-fare).

TTC services in York Region

Buses 
Some TTC bus routes travel into York Region and operate on behalf of YRT. This allows passengers to board a TTC bus in York Region and disembark in the City of Toronto and vice versa. Passengers crossing the Toronto–York boundary at Steeles Avenue on a TTC bus must pay an additional fare: a YRT fare is required for travel north of Steeles Avenue and a regular TTC fare for travel south of it.

Certain YRT routes enter Toronto, but City of Toronto regulations mean that passengers may not board inbound (towards Toronto)  or disembark on outbound (away from Toronto) YRT routes in Toronto. No extra fare is charged for travel solely on YRT vehicles in Toronto.

Since August 26, 2019, riders have been able to use their Presto card to pay both their YRT and TTC fares on TTC-operated bus routes that travel between York Region and Toronto. While single-use TTC paper Presto tickets can be used to pay a TTC fare for the subway (whether in York Region or Toronto) or TTC surface routes in Toronto, they cannot be used to pay a YRT fare on any YRT or TTC-operated bus routes in York Region.

Subway
On December 17, 2017, the western branch of Line 1 was extended into York Region. Coinciding with that opening, YRT took over the operation of four TTC-operated routes in Vaughan.

Brampton Transit fares in York Region

An agreement between YRT and Brampton Transit means passengers boarding Züm Queen east of Highway 50 (which largely duplicates service with Viva Orange while in York Region) will be assessed YRT fares even if they intend to disembark in Brampton. As a Brampton Transit route, Brampton Transit fare media (including those loaded onto a Presto card) may be used to board without any additional fares being assessed. However, despite the fare integration, passengers boarding with YRT passes will not be issued transfers for connecting to Brampton Transit routes in Brampton, and passengers boarding with Brampton Transit passes will not be issued transfers for connecting to YRT routes in York Region.

Brampton Transit and YRT have cooperated on routes connecting Brampton and Toronto via York Region, and for a time, certain YRT routes were jointly operated by YRT and Brampton Transit buses, where both agencies' fare media were accepted. The introduction of Züm Queen has ended operation of YRT route 77 to Bramalea City Centre. The acceptance of YRT fares on Brampton Transit routes in York Region are the last vestiges of such cooperation.

Vehicles and fleet rosters

YRT has 123 Viva bus rapid transit vehicles, 406 YRT buses, and 97 Mobility Plus vehicles. The initial fleet consisted of buses from previous York Region operators, but has since been expanded with YRT-bought vehicles.

Fleet colours

YRT's first fleet (2001–2006) was painted with a white base with blue and gold stripes. During the early years many buses still had their pre-2000 colours from the previous operators with "YRT" painted on the front and sides. The livery was changed On 2007 to a white and several tones of blue. Only the Viva fleet is all-blue, but one Orion I YRT (#2028) was painted all-blue for a colour demo. During the transition to the second colour theme some buses were all white with the old "YRT" label remaining.

Transit enforcement

Fare Inspectors and Special Constables patrol the entire YRT transit system for the safety and security of passengers and to ensure compliance with the proof-of-payment system used on Viva buses. They do random spot checks on board Viva buses to ensure the proper use of tickets, transfers and Presto cards. There is a time limit to be riding while paying one fare, and passengers without valid fares (even those whose two-hour travel window expires while on board a vehicle) are subject to a warning, fine, or a criminal charge.

CCTV cameras
In 2006, YRT began installing 150 cameras on YRT (including Viva and Mobility Plus) buses. By the end of 2008, there were to be 210 more cameras added to the system's vehicles. CCTV cameras are also installed in some of the Vivastations in Richmond Hill.

Routes

YRT-owned facilities

YRT owns a few facilities: many are shared with other transit agencies like the TTC, GO Transit and Brampton Transit.

 Richmond Hill Centre Terminal – has a bridge connecting to Langstaff GO train station
 Vaughan Mills Terminal – platforms only; no terminal building (shelters only)
 Bernard Terminal – driveway and platforms only
 Promenade Terminal – platforms only; no terminal building (shelters only)
 Pioneer Village Terminal – at  subway station
 SmartCentresPlace Terminal – adjacent to Vaughan Metropolitan Centre subway station
 Vaughan Metropolitan Centre Vivastation – covered transfer facility at Vaughan Metropolitan Centre station
 Numerous Viva stations along on-street Rapidways

Garages used to store buses are owned by contractors.

2011–2012 labour strike
Starting on October 24, 2011, bus drivers and workers contracted by Miller Transit, First Student and York BRT Services (Veolia) started striking, protesting over wages and benefits for three months. Over 60 percent of YRT bus routes in York region and all Viva routes did not operate. YRT and Viva workers started picketing on December 5, 2011, at Finch-GO Terminal, YRT headquarters, South-West Division Garage, and Richmond Hill Centre Terminal. 96% of all YRT/Viva routes returned to service on February 4, 2012, and 98% of services were operational on Monday, February 6, 2012. Full YRT/Viva service resumed on February 27, 2012. To compensate riders for the three months of service disruptions, York Region Transit provided two months of free service, using the money saved by not having to pay striking workers.

Officers
In December 2014, the executive of YRT consisted of:
 Chair: Wayne Emmerson (as York Region Chair)
 Vice-Chair (Regional Councillor): Dave Barrow

Operational executives are:

 Commissioner of Transportation Services: Daniel Kostopoulos
 General Manager: Ann-Marie Carroll – became GM December 2014 and interim GM from early 2014 to December 2014
 Richard J. Leary served as GM from 2010 to 2014; he had been Massachusetts Bay Transportation Authority chief operating officer and replaced YRT's first head Donald Gordon (2001–2009) and left in early 2014 for the Toronto Transit Commission)
 Vice-President of York Region Rapid Transit Corporation: Mary-Frances Turner

See also

 MoveOntario 2020

Notes

References

Works cited
 Markham Transit 1990 Rider's Guide, Town of Markham
 Markham Transit Fall 1994 Rider's Guide, Town of Markham
 Markham Transit Fall 1999 Rider's Guide, Town of Markham
 Markham Transit 2000 Rider's Guide, Town of Markham
 Transit History...Vaughan
 Transit History...Markham
 Transit History...Richmond Hill
 "vivatalk – York Region's Rapid Transit Update", Economist & Sun/Sun-Tribune: Community, June 11, 2005, p 7.

External links
 York Region Transit
 YRT fleet roster on CPTDB Wiki
 York Region Transit (Canadian Public Transit Discussion Board)
 The Toronto LRT Information Page (Page has a rendering of what a Viva LRV could look like)
 Drawings and photos of York Region Transit buses

 
Transit agencies in Ontario
Transdev